Rattus is a Finnish hardcore punk band that was formed in 1978 in Vilppula. They split up in 1988 but returned in 2001.

Members
Current
V-P - drums
Jopo - guitar, vocals
Tomppa - bass

Former members
Jake - guitar, vocals
Annikki - vocals

Discography

Albums
 WC räjähtää, 1982 (the Toilet Explodes)
 Uskonto on vaara, 1984 (Religion Is a Danger)
 Stolen Life, 1987 
 Rattus, 2005
 Uudet piikit, 2007 (New Thorns)
 Turta, 2014

EPs
 Fucking Disco, 1981
 Rattus on rautaa, 1981 (Rattus Rocks)
 Rajoitettu ydinsota, 1982 (Limited Nuclear War)
 Ihmiset on sairaita, 1985 (People Are Sick)

Singles
 "Khomeini Rock", 1980
 "Win or Die", 1988

Collections
 Rattus, 1983, released in U.S. (BCT) and Great Britain
 Levytykset 1981-1984, 1993 (Recordings 1981-1984)
 Täältä tullaan kuolema, 1996 (Here We Come Death)
 30th Anniversary of Rattus, 2007 in Malesia (Black Konflik Records)

References

External links

Musical groups established in 1978
Finnish hardcore punk groups